Aroma is a genus of skippers in the family Hesperiidae.

Species
Recognised species in the genus Aroma include:
 Aroma aroma (Hewitson, 1867)

References

Natural History Museum Lepidoptera genus database

Hesperiinae
Hesperiidae genera